State Route 274 (SR 274) is a west–east arc-shaped state highway located completely within the city of Temple in the northwestern part of the U.S. state of Georgia. From its western terminus, the route loops from US 78/SR 8 into downtown Temple, briefly becoming concurrent with SR 113, then exits downtown to meet its eastern terminus, again at US 78/SR 8.

Route description
SR 274 begins at an intersection with US 78/SR 8 in the central part of Temple. The route travels to the north-northeast along James Street. Then, it curves to the northeast. At Sage Street, in downtown Temple, it turns to the southeast, paralleling some Norfolk Southern Railway tracks. One block later, it intersects SR 113. The two highways are concurrent for two blocks. After SR 113 departs the concurrency, SR 274 continues to the southeast and meets its eastern terminus, a second intersection with US 78/SR 8.

SR 274 is not part of the National Highway System, a system of roadways important to the nation's economy, defense, and mobility.

Major intersections

See also

References

External links

274
Transportation in Carroll County, Georgia